The Kanguk Formation is a geological formation in the Northwest Territories and Nunavut, Canada whose strata date back to the Late Cretaceous. Dinosaur remains are among the fossils that have been recovered from the formation.

It was first described in the Kanguk Peninsula of the Axel Heiberg Island, along the shore of the Stand Fiord by Souther in 1963. The formation occurs throughout the Sverdrup Basin and the southern Queen Elizabeth Islands.

Lithology 
The Kanguk Formation is composed of dark shale and siltstone with interbeds of sandstone, bentonite and tuff. Thicker sandstone and conglomerate beds occur in the western reaches in Eglinton Island.

Fossil content 
The Kanguk Formation preserves an extensive record of shelf assemblages rich in benthic foraminifera that reveal numerous pulses of local hypoxia.

See also 
 List of dinosaur-bearing rock formations
 Strand Fiord Formation

References

Further reading 
 A. T. Pugh, C. J. Schröder-Adams, E. S. Carter, J. OHerrle, J. Galloway, J. W. Haggart, J. L. Andrews and K. Hatsukanoc. 2014. Cenomanian to Santonian radiolarian biostratigraphy, carbon isotope stratigraphy and paleoenvironments of the Sverdrup Basin, Ellef Ringnes Island, Nunavut, Canada. Palaeogeography, Palaeoclimatology, Palaeoecology 413:101-122
 J. A. Tarduno, D. B. Brinkman, P. R. Renne, R. D. Cottrell, H. Scher and P. Castillo. 1998. Evidence for extreme climatic warmth from Late Cretaceous Arctic vertebrates. Science 282:2241-2244

Stratigraphy of the Northwest Territories
Stratigraphy of Nunavut
Upper Cretaceous Series of North America
Maastrichtian Stage of North America
Campanian Stage
Cenomanian Stage
Coniacian Stage
Santonian Stage
Turonian Stage
Sandstone formations of Canada
Shale formations
Siltstone formations
Tuff formations